Andrew Ilie defeated Davide Sanguinetti 7–5, 6–4 to win the 1998 International Tennis Championships singles event. Jason Stoltenberg was the defending champion.

Seeds

  Jason Stoltenberg (first round)
  Vincent Spadea (second round)
  Andrei Pavel (first round)
  Wayne Black (second round)
  Mikael Tillström (second round)
  Steve Campbell (second round)
  Álex Calatrava (first round)
  Davide Sanguinetti (final)

Draw

Finals

Top half

Bottom half

External links
 1998 International Tennis Championships draw

Singles
Delray Beach Open